Else Holmelund Minarik (née Holmelund; September 13, 1920 – July 12, 2012) was a Danish-born American author of more than 40 children's books. She was most commonly associated with her Little Bear series of children's books, which were adapted for television. Minarik was also the author of another well-known book, No Fighting, No Biting!

Biography
Born in Fredericia, Denmark, Minarik immigrated to the United States at the age of four with her family. By 1940, Else had married Walter Minarik, who died in 1963. After graduating from Queens College, City University of New York (B.A., 1942), she became a journalist, for the Daily Sentinel newspaper of Rome, New York, during World War II. She subsequently lived on Long Island, where she was employed as a first-grade teacher for the Commack School District. She later lived in West Nottingham, New Hampshire. Minarik married her second husband, Pulitzer-winning journalist Homer Bigart, in 1970; after his death in 1991, she moved to Sunset Beach in Brunswick County, North Carolina, where she continued writing longhand, as she always had.

Minarik's last book, Little Bear and the Marco Polo, was published in 2010. After having suffered a heart attack at 91, she died at home from complications, on July 12, 2012.

Selected bibliography
Little Bear series (illustrated by Maurice Sendak, except for the last entry):
Little Bear (1957)
Father Bear Comes Home (1959)
Little Bear's Friend (1960)
Little Bear's Visit (1961)
A Kiss for Little Bear (1968)
Little Bear and the Marco Polo (2010) – illustrated by Dorothy Doubleday
No Fighting, No Biting! (1958) – illustrated by Maurice Sendak
Cat and Dog (1960) – illustrated by Fritz Siebel (published with new illustrations by Bryan Langdo in 2005)
The Little Giant Girl and Elf Boy (1963) – illustrated by Garth Williams
Percy and the Five Houses (1989) – illustrated by James Stevenson

References

External links

Holmelund Minarik at the Children's Literature Network
New Hampshire Public Radio Interview

1920 births
2012 deaths
Queens College, City University of New York alumni
Danish emigrants to the United States
People from Rockingham County, New Hampshire
American women children's writers
People from Fredericia
American children's writers
20th-century American writers
20th-century American women writers
21st-century American writers
21st-century American women writers
Writers from New York (state)
Writers from New Hampshire